Bermange is a surname. Notable people with the surname include:

Alexander S. Bermange (born 1976), English songwriter and lyricist
Benedict Bermange (born 1975), British cricket scorer